Niverville is a former Boston and Albany Railroad station in the hamlet of Niverville, New York.

The station itself was built in the 1840s by the Western Railroad of Massachusetts, and became part of the Boston and Albany Railroad in 1870. Service to this station ceased in the late 1940s. The building presently has 3 apartments upstairs and a tavern on the ground floor. The station is currently known as the Niverville Pub.

External links
Niverville B&A Station map (Track Charts of the Boston and Albany Railroad)
Niverville Pub (Twitter Page)

Former Boston and Albany Railroad stations
Former railway stations in New York (state)
Railway stations in Columbia County, New York
1840s establishments in New York (state)
Repurposed railway stations in the United States
Transportation in Columbia County, New York